Sari Chaman (also Romanized as Sārī Chaman; also known as Sar Chīmeh, Sar-e-Chamā, Sere-Chima, and Ser-i-Chima) is a village in Bakrabad Rural District, in the Central District of Varzaqan County, East Azerbaijan Province, Iran. At the 2006 census, its population was 93, in 18 families.

References 

Towns and villages in Varzaqan County